These are the official results of the Men's Javelin Throw event at the 1999 World Championships in Seville, Spain. There were a total number of 40 participating athletes, with the final held on Sunday 29 August 1999.

Medalists

Schedule
All times are Central European Time (UTC+1)

Abbreviations
All results shown are in metres

Startlist

Records

Qualification

Group A

Group B

Final

See also
 1996 Men's Olympic Javelin Throw (Atlanta)
 1998 Men's European Championships Javelin Throw (Budapest)
 2000 Men's Olympic Javelin Throw (Sydney)
 2002 Men's European Championships Javelin Throw (Munich)

References
 Results
 IAAF results
 koti.welho
 trackandfieldnews

J
Javelin throw at the World Athletics Championships